Gil Juco Puyat Sr. (September 1, 1907 – March 23, 1980) was a Filipino politician and businessman who served as a Senator of the Philippines from 1951 until 1972, when President Ferdinand Marcos shut Congress down and declared Martial Law, and as Senate President from 1967 to 1972.

Education
Having been exposed to the world of business, Puyat was inevitably drawn to a course in commerce for his higher education. This he pursued at the University of the Philippines where he topped his class. Even as a student, he was already immersed in intricate operations of finance and expense, of capital and production, and of management labor handling. He was a member of the college-based Pan Xenia Fraternity and Upsilon Sigma Phi.

Early career
He became a member of the Rotary Club of Manila at about the same time that he was also a young professor of economics at the University of the Philippines. Puyat's skill in managing the family business caught the eye of the late President Manuel L. Quezon. At the time, the country was predominantly agricultural in activity and the President was advocating industrialization. Quezon named the young Puyat as dean of the College of Business Administration at the University of the Philippines when he was 33. An active member of international trades bodies, he acquired international stature in business. The Business Writers’ Association of the Philippines voted him "Business Leader of the Year" in 1948 and the Association of Red Feather Agencies voted him "Civic Leader of the Year" in 1949. 

In 1953, he received a plaque from the Community Chest of Greater Manila for “outstanding services as one of the founders, first president and first campaign fund chairman“ of the body. The Philippine Institute of Public Opinion (PIPO) awarded him a certificate of honor for demonstrating national leadership in business, economics, the civic and political fields and for his distinguished service to the youth.

Political career
In the Philippine midterm elections of 1951, he was elected Senator and he served in the Philippine Senate until its closure by Martial Law in 1972. From 1967, he was the Senate President.

As a legislator, Puyat created a few reforms and other things involving the dispensation of public works funds.

Business activities
He is founder of Manila Banking Corporation (now Chinabank Savings Bank), Manila Bankers Life Insurance Corporation and the Loyola Group of Companies. The Loyola Group of Companies is composed of Loyola Plans Consolidated Inc., Group Developers Inc. and Loyola Memorial Chapels and Crematorium Inc.

He founded Loyola Plans Consolidated Inc. in 1968 and today it is the oldest Pre-need Company in continuous operation. Group Developers pioneered the concept of memorial parks in the Philippines with its two signature memorial parks in Marikina and Sucat. Loyola Memorial Chapels was the first to use modern cremation technology in the Philippines. Loyola Memorial Chapels has six branches, all in Luzon.

Family background
Puyat is the third child of Philippine Pioneer Industrialist Gonzalo Puyat and Nicasia Juco, both from Guagua, Pampanga. He was trained early in life by his father, Don Gonzalo, in the trade of manufacturing billiard tables and bowling alleys. Eventually, he assisted in managing the family business of Gonzalo Puyat & Sons, the brand holder of AMF-Puyat, Puyat Steel, and Puyat Vinyl.

Puyat was married to Eugenia Guidote, an accountant and pioneer member of the Philippine Institute of Certified Public Accountants (PICPA), and a trained opera singer (soprano). They had seven children – Gil Jr. (deceased), Vicente (deceased), Antonio (deceased), Victor, Jesusa (deceased), Alfonso and Eugenia.

Death
In 1978, he was invested as a member of the Order of St. Gregory the Great. He died, 2 years later, on March 22, 1980 due to cardiac arrest, one of the complications of an asthma attack. He was buried on March 28, 1980 at Loyola Memorial Park in Marikina.

Buendia Avenue, which was originally named after Nicolas Buendia, is now named after him, but most people tend to use the original name of the road.

References

External links and sources
Official Website of the Philippine Senate – Sen. Gil J. Puyat

1907 births
1981 deaths
Presidents of the Senate of the Philippines
Senators of the 7th Congress of the Philippines
Senators of the 6th Congress of the Philippines
Senators of the 5th Congress of the Philippines
Senators of the 4th Congress of the Philippines
Senators of the 3rd Congress of the Philippines
Senators of the 2nd Congress of the Philippines
People from Pampanga
People from Guagua
People from Manila
Filipino people of Kapampangan descent
University of the Philippines alumni
Nacionalista Party politicians
Knights of St. Gregory the Great
Burials at the Loyola Memorial Park
Candidates in the 1961 Philippine vice-presidential election
Presidents of the Nacionalista Party